Milford Township is a township in Brown County, Minnesota, United States. The population was 793 as of the 2000 census.

History
Milford Township was organized in 1858. It was named from a sawmill at a ford.

Geography
According to the United States Census Bureau, the township has a total area of 39.6 square miles (102.5 km), of which 39.2 square miles (101.5 km) is land and 0.4 square miles (1.0 km) (0.96%) is water.

The west quarter of the city of New Ulm is within the township geographically but is a separate entity.

Unincorporated communities
 Essig at 
 Essig Trailer Court at

Major highway
  U.S. Highway 14

Lakes
 Horseshoe Lake

Adjacent townships
 West Newton Township, Nicollet County (north)
 Lafayette Township, Nicollet County (northeast)
 Cottonwood Township (southeast)
 Sigel Township (south)
 Stark Township (southwest)
 Home Township (west)
 Ridgely Township, Nicollet County (northwest)

Demographics
As of the census of 2000, there were 793 people, 269 households, and 225 families residing in the township.  The population density was 20.2 people per square mile (7.8/km).  There were 279 housing units at an average density of 7.1/sq mi (2.7/km).  The racial makeup of the township was 99.37% White, 0.25% Asian, 0.25% from other races, and 0.13% from two or more races. Hispanic or Latino of any race were 0.50% of the population.

There were 269 households, out of which 42.0% had children under the age of 18 living with them, 79.2% were married couples living together, 2.6% had a female householder with no husband present, and 16.0% were non-families. 13.4% of all households were made up of individuals, and 3.7% had someone living alone who was 65 years of age or older.  The average household size was 2.94 and the average family size was 3.23.

In the township the population was spread out, with 29.5% under the age of 18, 6.8% from 18 to 24, 27.5% from 25 to 44, 24.0% from 45 to 64, and 12.2% who were 65 years of age or older.  The median age was 39 years. For every 100 females, there were 113.2 males.  For every 100 females age 18 and over, there were 115.8 males.

The median income for a household in the township was $57,813, and the median income for a family was $58,854. Males had a median income of $36,833 versus $25,729 for females. The per capita income for the township was $20,417.  About 3.8% of families and 3.2% of the population were below the poverty line, including 2.3% of those under age 18 and 2.5% of those age 65 or over.

References
 United States National Atlas
 United States Census Bureau 2007 TIGER/Line Shapefiles
 United States Board on Geographic Names (GNIS)

Townships in Brown County, Minnesota
Townships in Minnesota